The first season of Chicago Fire, an American drama television series with executive producer Dick Wolf, and producers Derek Haas, Michael Brandt, and Matt Olmstead premiered on October 10, 2012, at Wednesday 10:00 p.m. EST, on NBC television network. The season concluded after 24 episodes on May 22, 2013.

Overview
The show follows the lives of the firefighters and paramedics working for the Chicago Fire Department at the firehouse of Engine 51, Truck 81, Squad 3, Ambulance 61 and Battalion 25.

Cast and characters

Regular cast members
 Jesse Spencer as Lieutenant Matthew Casey-Truck 81
 Taylor Kinney as Lieutenant Kelly Severide-Squad 3
 Monica Raymund as Paramedic in Charge Gabriela Dawson-Ambulance 61
 Lauren German as Paramedic Leslie Shay-Ambulance 61
 Charlie Barnett as Firefighter Candidate Peter Mills-Truck 81
 Eamonn Walker as Battalion Chief Wallace Boden-Battalion 25
 David Eigenberg as Firefighter Christopher Hermann-Truck 81
 Teri Reeves as Doctor Hallie Thomas (Main, episodes 1-7; guest, episodes 20-22)

Recurring cast members
 Yuri Sardarov as Firefighter Brian "Otis" Zvonecek-Truck 81
 Joe Minoso as Firefighter/Chauffeur Joe Cruz-Truck 81
 Christian Stolte as Firefighter Randy "Mouch" McHolland-Truck 81
 Jon Seda as Detective Antonio Dawson
 Robyn Coffin as Cindy Hermann
 Jason Beghe as Detective Hank Voight
 Mo Gallini as Firefighter Jose Vargas-Truck 81/Squad 3
 William Smillie as Firefighter Kevin Hadley-Squad 3
 Randy Flagler as Firefighter Harold Capp-Squad 3
 Anthony Ferraris as Firefighter Tony Ferraris-Squad 3
 Chaon Cross as Heather Darden
 Jeff Lima as Leon Cruz
 Linda Powell as Ingrid Mills
 Alexandra Metz as Elise Mills
 Shiri Appleby as Clarice Carthage
 Treat Williams as Benny Severide
 Nicole Forester as Christie Casey Jordan
 Kathleen Quinlan as Nancy Casey
 Cody Sullivan as Ernie
 Shane McRae as Lieutenant Eric Whaley

Guest stars
 Corey Sorenson as Firefighter Andy Darden-Truck 81
 Melissa Sagemiller as Detective Jules Wilhite
 LaRoyce Hawkins as Officer Kevin Atwater

Special guest
 Rahm Emanuel as himself (Mayor of Chicago)

Episodes

Production
The series pilot, co-written by creators Michael Brandt and Derek Haas, was filmed in Chicago and, according to an NBC representative, the series will continue to be filmed there.  Mayor of Chicago Rahm Emanuel made an appearance in the series' pilot episode.  Emanuel stated: "It's easier being mayor than playing mayor. I told them I'd do it under one condition: the TV show is making an investment to the Firefighters' Widows and Orphans Fund."

The network placed an order for the series in May 2012.<ref>{{cite web|url=https://www.deadline.com/2012/05/nbc-renews-law-order-svu-inks-new-deal-with-dick-wolf-picks-up-chicago-fire/|title=NBC Renews 'Law & Order: SV, Picks Up 'Chicago Fire', Inks New Deal With Dick Wolf|date=May 9, 2012|last=Andreeva|first=Nellie|website=Deadline Hollywood|accessdate=May 9, 2012|archive-url=https://web.archive.org/web/20120510061000/http://www.deadline.com/2012/05/nbc-renews-law-order-svu-inks-new-deal-with-dick-wolf-picks-up-chicago-fire/|archive-date=May 10, 2012|url-status=live}}</ref>  After receiving an additional script order in October, Chicago Fire was picked up for a full season on November 8, 2012.  On January 29, 2013, Chicago Fire had its episode total increased from 22 to 23.  One week later, on February 6, 2013, Chicago Fire received one more episode, giving it a total of 24 episodes for season one.

The firehouse shown is Engine 18's quarters, located at 1360 S. Blue Island Ave. between 13th & Racine. Housed here is Engine 18, 2-2-1 (Deputy District Chief - 1st District), 4-5-7 (Paramedic Field Chief - EMS District 7), 6-4-16 (High-Rise Response Unit), and Ambulance 65.

Spinoff

On March 27, 2013, NBC announced plans for a proposed spin-off of Chicago Fire, Deadline reported they heard the spin-off would involve the Chicago Police Department, the spin-off series being created and produced by Dick Wolf, with Derek Haas, Michael Brant, and Matt Olmstead serving as executive producers. It premiered on January 8, 2014.

The show follows an Intelligence Unit and is filmed entirely in Chicago. The main cast includes Jason Beghe, Jon Seda, Sophia Bush, Jesse Lee Soffer, Patrick Flueger, Elias Koteas, Marina Squerciati, LaRoyce Hawkins, and Archie Kao.

A crossover between the two Chicago'' shows aired on April 29 and 30, 2014 depicting an explosion that brings the fire and police departments together.

Home media
The DVD release of season one was released in Region 1 on September 10, 2013

References

External links

2012 American television seasons
2013 American television seasons
Chicago Fire (TV series) seasons